Mahniči is a small settlement in the Municipality of Sežana in the Littoral region of Slovenia.

The local church is dedicated to Saint Anthony the Hermit and belongs to the Parish of Štjak.

References

External links

Mahniči on Geopedia

Populated places in the Municipality of Sežana